The Christa McAuliffe silver dollar is a commemorative coin which was issued by the United States Mint in 2021.

Legislation 
The Christa McAuliffe Commemorative Coin Act of 2019 authorized the production of a commemorative silver dollar to commemorate the life of Christa McAuliffe, a former social studies teacher who in 1985, was chosen to be the first participant in the National Aeronautics and Space Administration’s Teacher in Space program. On January 28, 1986, McAuliffe and six astronauts were tragically killed when Space Shuttle Challenger exploded after launch. The act allowed the coins to be struck in both proof and uncirculated finishes. The coin was first released on January 28, 2021, the 35th anniversary of the disaster.

Design 
The obverse of the Christa McAuliffe commemorative dollar, designed by Laurie J. Musser and sculpted by Phebe Hemphill, depicts a portrait of Christa McAuliffe with a hopeful gaze. The reverse, designed by Emily Damstra and sculpted by Joseph Menna, depicts McAuliffe as a teacher, smiling as she points forward and upward, symbolizing the future while three high school-age students look on with wonder. Seven stars above them pay tribute to those who perished in the Challenger tragedy. The logo of the FIRST (For Inspiration and Recognition of Science and Technology) organization is also included.

Specifications 
 Display Box Color: Black with artwork on the slipcover 
 Edge: Reeded
 Weight: 26.730 grams; 0.76 troy ounce
 Diameter: 38.10 millimeters; 1.500 inches
 Composition: 99.9% Silver

See also
 
 
 United States commemorative coins
 List of United States commemorative coins and medals (2020s)

References 

Modern United States commemorative coins
2021 works